D216 is a state road in central Croatia connecting Vojnić and the D6 state road to Maljevac border crossing to Velika Kladuša, Bosnia and Herzegovina.

The road, as well as all other state roads in Croatia, is managed and maintained by Hrvatske ceste, state owned company.

Traffic volume 

Traffic is regularly counted and reported by Hrvatske ceste, operator of the road.

Road junctions and populated areas

Sources

State roads in Croatia
Sisak-Moslavina County